is a Japan-exclusive video game released for the Family Computer in addition to various other systems. It is a side-scrolling action role-playing game similar to Mystical Ninja.

Summary
The player controls an old wooden figure named "Poco."

He is a hero who has lived in harmony with humans for many years. For Poco, the journey is to find the fairy who teaches people to get back to being friendly with wooden dolls. Enemies encountered through the game are strange creatures and bothersome old men. The player attacks by using his fists at them. Players can steal the items in the store.  But after stealing, the player's appearance is changed to resemble that of a thief. Hotels and pawn shops can no longer admit the player for the remainder of the game after a theft has taken place.

The player can equip one hand with a weapon, and the other with a passive tool, such as a lamp for dark areas. The player can buy gear, sleep at hotels, gamble, steal, and bribe non-player characters. The player needs to eat to prevent hunger, with recharging health based on food level. It features an in-game clock, with day/night cycles and four seasons; the color changes to reflect the time of day and the season.

References

1986 video games
Action role-playing video games
DB-SOFT games
Fairies and sprites in popular culture
FM-7 games
Japan-exclusive video games
MSX2 games
NEC PC-8801 games
Nintendo Entertainment System games
Sentient toys in fiction
Sharp X1 games
Side-scrolling role-playing video games
Video games about toys
Video games developed in Japan